My Lucky Charm 情来运转 is a 25 episode Chinese drama shown on MediaCorp Channel 8 in Singapore and made its debut on 3 January 2005.

Cast

Awards

Trivia
This series was mentioned in episode 45 of 118.

External links
Official Website (English Edition)
Official Website (Chinese Edition)

Singapore Chinese dramas
2005 Singaporean television series debuts
2005 Singaporean television series endings
Channel 8 (Singapore) original programming